Within may refer to:

 Within (William Joseph album) (2004), by pianist William Joseph
 Within (Embraced album) (2000), by Swedish melodic black metal band Embraced
 Within (company), a virtual reality content and technology company based in Los Angeles
 "Within" (The X-Files), an episode of The X-Files
 "Within", a song from the album Random Access Memories by Daft Punk
 Philosophy towards Attention